Fritz Seifart House is a historic home located at Charlotte, Mecklenburg County, North Carolina.  It was built in 1938, and is a Tudor Revival style dwelling of ashlar granite with stonework and patterned brick accents and multiple, stuccoed gables embellished with half-timbering. It has an irregular massing of one and two story sections with a one-story, rear service wing.  It features a semi-hexagonal, polygonal-roofed entry tower and massive, stone, exterior chimney.

It was listed on the National Register of Historic Places in 2006.

References

Houses on the National Register of Historic Places in North Carolina
Tudor Revival architecture in North Carolina
Houses completed in 1938
Houses in Charlotte, North Carolina
National Register of Historic Places in Mecklenburg County, North Carolina